Halpe is a genus of grass skippers in the family Hesperiidae. It is found in the Indomalayan realm.

Species
Halpe albicilla de Jong & Treadaway, 1993 Sulawesi.
Halpe arcuata  Evans, 1937 Northeast India, Burma to Malay Peninsula, Laos, Yunnan
Halpe aucma Swinhoe, 1893 Tibet
Halpe aurifera (Elwes & Edwards, 1897) Burma, Thailand, Malaysia, Nias
Halpe beturia (Hewitson, 1868) Sulawesi, Banggai
Halpe burmana Swinhoe, 1893 Burma, Thailand, Laos
Halpe clara Cassidy, 1985 Borneo
Halpe damar Bedford-Russel, 1984 Sulawesi
Halpe dante Evans, 1949
Halpe dizangpusa Huang, 2002 China
Halpe elana Eliot, 1939 Thailand, Laos, Malaya
Halpe fasciata Elwes & Edwards, 1897
Halpe filda Evans, 1949 Tibet, Sikkim
Halpe flava  Evans, 1926 Burma, Thailand, Laos, Malaya, Borneo
Halpe frontieri Devyatkin, 1997 Vietnam
Halpe gamma  Evans, 1937 China, Formosa
Halpe handa Evans, 1949 Burma, Thailand, Laos, Vietnam, Yunnan
Halpe hauxwelli  Evans, 1937 Burma, Thailand, Laos, Yunnan
Halpe hermaphrodite Chiba & Tsukiyama, 1999 Philippines
Halpe hieron de Nicéville, 1894 Sumatra
Halpe homolea (Hewitson, 1868) Sikkim - Assam, Burma, Ceylon Malaya, Java
Halpe honorei de Nicéville, 1887 South India 
Halpe inconspicua de Jong & Treadaway, 1993 Philippines
Halpe insignis (Distant, 1886) Burma, Thailand, Malaysia, Singapore, Borneo, Sumatra
Halpe knyvetti Elwes & Edwards, 1897 India, Tibet, Sikkim
Halpe kumara de Nicéville, 1885 Sikkim, Assam, Yunnan
Halpe kusala Frühstorfer, 1911 Burma, Thailand, Laos, Vietnam
Halpe luteisquama (Mabille, 1877) Philippines
Halpe luzona Evans, 1949 Philippines
Halpe mixta Huang, 2003 Yunnan
Halpe molta Evans, 1949 Tibet
Halpe muoi Huang, 1999 Yunnan
Halpe nephele Leech, 1893 Sichuan, Laos
Halpe nuydai Murayama & Okumura, 1973
Halpe ormenes (Plötz, 1886) Sikkim to Burma, Yunnan, Thailand, Laos, Malaya, Java  
Halpe palawea Staudinger, 1889 
Halpe parakumara Huang, 2003 China
Halpe paupera Devyatkin, 2002 Vietnam, Hong Kong
Halpe pelethronix Frühstorfer, 1910 Burma, Thailand, Malaya, Borneo, Sumatra, Java, Sundaland
Halpe porus (Mabille, 1877) Nilgiris, Coorg, Kanara, Bihar, Mussoorie to Burma, West China, Hong Kong, Thailand, Laos, Vietnam, Malaya, Hainan, Langkawi
Halpe purpurascens de Jong & Treadaway, 1993 Philippines
Halpe scissa Cantlie, 1961 Assam
Halpe sikkima Moore, 1882 Sikkim to Burma, Thailand, Laos, Hainan, Malaya, Borneo, Sumatra, Java
Halpe sulphurifera (Herrich-Schäffer, 1869)
Halpe tilia Evans, 1949 Philippines
Halpe toxopea Evans, 1932 Thailand, Langkawi, Malaya, Borneo, Sumatra, Java, Bali, Palawan
Halpe veluvana Frühstorfer, 1911 Java
Halpe wantona Swinhoe, 1893 Assam to Burma, Thailand, Laos, Malaya
Halpe zandra Evans, 1937
Halpe zema (Hewitson, 1877) Sikkim to Burma, Thailand, Laos, Yunnan,  Malaya, Java
Halpe zinda Evans, 1937 Malaya
Halpe zola  Evans, 1937 Burma, Thailand, Laos

Biology
Halpe larvae feed on Gramineae including Dinochloa, Ochlandra talbotii and Bambusa

References

Natural History Museum Lepidoptera genus database

External links
Funet

Astictopterini
Butterflies of Indochina
Hesperiidae genera